Dungourney GAA is a Gaelic Athletic Association club based in Dungourney, County Cork, Ireland. The club fields teams in both Gaelic football and hurling. It is a member of the Imokilly division of Cork GAA. The club was one of the strongest clubs in the Cork during the first decade of the 20th century. Its 3 Cork Senior Hurling Championship titles were the most by a club outside Cork City for many years. The best known player is Jamesy Kelleher who was included on Cork's Hurling Team of the Century. In 1902, the club represented Cork in the All-Ireland Senior Hurling Championship. This resulted in the club winning the All-Ireland hurling title.

Achievements
 Cork Senior Hurling Championship Winners (3) 1902, 1907, 1909  Runners-Up 1900, 1910
 Munster Junior Club Hurling Championship Winners (1) 2015
 Cork Intermediate A Hurling Championship Winners 2022
 Cork Junior Hurling Championship Winners (1) 2015 Runner-Up 2006
 Cork Under-21 B Hurling Championship Winner (1) 2012
 East Cork Junior A Hurling Championship Winner (4) 1972, 2006, 2011, 2015  Runner-Up 1970, 1971, 1976, 1981, 1998, 2003, 2010
 East Cork Under-21 B Hurling Championship Winner (3) 1999, 2001, 2012

Notable players
 Jerry Desmond
 Jamesy Kelleher
 Pat Leahy
 Tom Mahony
 Jackie O'Shea
 Maurice O'Shea
 Jim Ronayne
 Liam Ahern

References

External sources
 Cork GAA finals

Gaelic games clubs in County Cork
Gaelic football clubs in County Cork
Hurling clubs in County Cork